Jim Mora is the name of:
 Jim E. Mora (born 1935), former head coach of the NFL's New Orleans Saints and Indianapolis Colts, and the USFL's Philadelphia/Baltimore Stars
 Jim L. Mora (born 1961), former college football head coach at UCLA, former NFL coach, and son of Jim E. Mora
 Jim Mora (broadcaster), New Zealand television and radio presenter